The 2011 Stratford-on-Avon District Council election to the Stratford-on-Avon District Council took place on Thursday 5 May 2011.

Seventeen seats were up for election, one third of the councillors. The previous elections in 2010 produced a majority for the Conservative Party.

Election result

Ward results

2011 English local elections
2011
2010s in Warwickshire